An  is a kind of yōkai, demon, orc, ogre, or troll in Japanese folklore. Oni are mostly known for their fierce and evil nature manifested in their propensity for murder and cannibalism. Notwithstanding their evil reputation, oni possess complex aspects that cannot be brushed away simply as evil. They are typically portrayed as hulking figures with one or more horns growing out of their heads. Stereotypically, they are conceived of as red, blue, black, yellow, or white-colored, wearing loincloths of tiger pelt, and carrying iron kanabō clubs. They are creatures which instill fear and feelings of danger due to their grotesque outward appearance, their wild and sometimes strange behavior and their powers.

They are popular characters in Japanese art, literature, and theater and appear as stock villains in the well-known fairytales of Momotarō (Peach Boy), Issun-bōshi, and Kobutori Jīsan. Although Oni have been described as frightening creatures, they have become tamer in modern culture as people tell less frightening stories about them like Oni Mask and Red Oni Who Cried.

Shuten-dōji has been regarded as the most famous and strongest oni in Japan. The legend of Shuten-dōji has been described since the 14th century in various arts, traditional performing arts and literature such as emakimono, jōruri, noh and kabuki. The tachi (Japanese long sword) "Dōjigiri" with which Minamoto no Yorimitsu decapitated Shuten-dōji''' in the legend is now designated as a National Treasure and one of the Tenka-Goken (Five Greatest Swords Under Heaven).Shuten-dōji. Kotobank.

Description

Depictions of yokai oni vary widely but usually portray them as hideous, gigantic ogre-like creatures with a single horn or multiple horns emerging from their heads, with sharp claws, wild hair, and fang-like tusks.

They are often depicted wearing tiger-skin loincloths and carrying iron clubs called . This image leads to the expression , that is, to be invincible or undefeatable.

Their skin may have various colors, but red, blue, and green are particularly common. They may sometimes also be depicted as black-skinned, or yellow-skinned.

They may occasionally be depicted with a third eye on their forehead, or extra fingers and toes.

They are predominantly male but can be female. Females becoming oni has been attributed to them being overcome with grief or jealousy.

Oni can come in many different sizes ranging in both weight and height.

Origins

An old etymology for "oni" is that the word derives from on, the on'yomi reading of a character meaning "to hide or conceal", due to oni having the tendency of "hiding behind things, not wishing to appear". This explanation is found in the 10th century dictionary Wamyōshō, which reveals that the oni at the time had a different meaning, defined as "a soul/spirit of the dead".

The character for oni, 鬼 in Chinese also means a dead or ancestral spirit, and not necessarily an evil specter. Accordingly, Chinese (Taoist) origins for the concept of oni have been proposed. Particularly powerful oni may be described as kishin or kijin (literally "oni god"; the "ki" is an alternate character reading of "oni"), a term used in Japanese Buddhism to refer to Wrathful Deities.

The oni was syncretized with Hindu-Buddhist creatures such as the man-devouring yaksha and the rakshasa, and became the oni who tormented sinners as wardens of Hell (Jigoku), administering sentences passed down by Hell's magistrate, King Yama (Enma Daiō). The hungry ghosts called  have also been sometimes considered a type of oni (the Kanji for "ki" 鬼 is also read "oni"). Accordingly, a wicked soul beyond rehabilitation transforms into an oni after death. Only the very worst people turn into oni while alive, and these are the oni causing troubles among humans as presented in folk tales.

Some scholars have even argued that the oni was entirely a concept of Buddhist mythology.

Oni bring calamities to the land, bringing about war, plague/illness, earthquakes, and eclipses. They have the destructive power of lightning and thunder, which terrifies people through their auditory and visual effects.

Oni have a massive appetite for human flesh and can eat a person in a single gulp. They are said to suck in a human's vital energy and devour her or his flesh. Oni are capable of transforming into both male and female forms at will, and can change from their grotesque form to a handsome man so that they can gain the trust of their victim.

Demon gate

According to Chinese Taoism and esoteric Onmyōdō, the ways of yin and yang, the northeasterly direction is termed the kimon (鬼門, "demon gate") and considered an unlucky direction through which evil spirits passed. Based on the assignment of the twelve zodiac animals to the cardinal directions, the kimon was also known as the ushitora (丑寅), or "Ox Tiger" direction. One hypothesis is that the onis bovine horns and tiger-skin loincloth developed as a visual depiction of this term.

Temples are often built facing that direction, for example, Enryaku-ji was deliberately built on  Mount Hiei which was in the kimon (northeasterly) direction from Kyoto in order to guard the capital, and similarly Kan'ei-ji was built towards that direction from Edo Castle.

However, skeptics doubt this could have been the initial design of Enryaku-ji temple, since the temple was founded in 788, six years before Kyoto even existed as a capital, and if the ruling class were so feng shui-minded, the subsequent northeasterly move of the capital from Nagaoka-kyō to Kyoto would have certainly been taboo.

Japanese buildings may sometimes have L-shaped indentations at the northeast to ward against oni. For example, the walls surrounding the Kyoto Imperial Palace have notched corners in that direction.

Traditional culture
The traditional bean-throwing custom to drive out oni is practiced during Setsubun festival in February. It involves people casting roasted soybeans indoors or out of their homes and shouting , preferably by a strong wrestler.

Regionally around Tottori Prefecture during this season, a charm made of holly leaves and dried sardine heads are used as a guard against oni.

There is also a well-known game in Japan called , which is the same as the game of tag that children in the Western world play. The player who is "it" is instead called the "oni".

Oni are featured in Japanese children's stories such as Momotarō (Peach Boy), Issun-bōshi, and Kobutori Jīsan.

Modern times

In more recent times, oni have lost some of their original wickedness and sometimes take on a more protective function. Men in oni costumes often lead Japanese parades to dispel any bad luck, for example.

Japanese buildings sometimes include oni-faced roof tiles called , which are thought to ward away bad luck, much like gargoyles in Western tradition.

Many Japanese idioms and proverbs also make reference to oni. For example, the expression  (Translation: "A child that does not resemble its parents is the child of an oni.") may be used by a parent to chastise a misbehaving child.

They can be used in stories to frighten children into obeying because of their grotesque appearance, savage demeanor, as well as how they can eat people in a single gulp.

 Stories 

 Momotaro, the Peach Boy, is a well-known story about an elderly couple having the misfortune of never being able to conceive a child, but they find a giant peach that miraculously gives them a boy as their child. As the boy grows, he is made aware of an island of demons where the people are captured and, after their money is taken, kept as slaves and a source of food. Momotaro sets out to travel to the island with some cakes specially made for him, and while on his journey, he meets a dog, a monkey, and a pheasant who partner up with him to defeat the demons on the island, and once the demons have been taken out they recover the treasures and return them to the rightful owners. Momotaro and his companions, after accomplishing their goal, all return to their respective homes.
 Oni Mask is a story where a young girl goes off to work at a ladies' house to make money for her ailing mother. She talks to a mask of her mother's face once she is done with her work to comfort herself. One day, the curious coworkers see the mask and decide to prank her by putting on an oni mask to replace the mother's mask. Seeing the Oni mask, she takes it as a sign that her mother is worse and not getting better, so she leaves after alerting her boss. After trying to run to her mother's side, she is sidetracked by some men gambling by a campfire. The men catch her and ignore her pleas to let her go to her mother and instead make her watch the fire so it does not go out during the game. While she is stoking the fire, she decides to put on the Oni mask to protect her from the flames. At that moment, the men see only a brightly lit Oni through the red glowing flames and, terrified, run away without gathering their money. The girl, after having made sure the fire would not go out, gathers the money, and waits for the men to return for it, but as time grows, she remembers she was going to see her mother and runs to her mother. While she is at home, she sees her mother is healthier than before, and because of the money the gamblers left behind, she has enough to take care of her without going back to work at the ladies' house.
 Red Oni Who Cried is a story of two oni, one red the other blue. The red one wants to befriend humankind, but they are afraid of it, making the red oni cry. Knowing what the red oni wants, the blue oni devises a plan to make himself the villain by attacking the houses of the humans and allowing the red oni to save the humans from the blue oni, making the red oni a hero to the humans' eyes. After the humans see the red oni protect them from the blue oni, they determine that the red one is a good oni whom they would like to be friends with, which is what the red one wanted. Seeing this exchange, the blue oni decides to leave so as not to cause any misunderstanding with the humans. When the red oni decides to go home to his friend the blue oni, he notices that the blue oni is gone and realizes what the blue oni has done for him and cries from being touched by the blue oni's thoughtfulness and wonderful friendship.

Gallery

In popular culture

The oni remains a very popular motif in Japanese popular culture. Their varied modern depiction sometimes relies on just one or two distinctive features which mark a character as an oni, they will always have horns and will sometimes have a distinctive skin colour, but such a depiction might otherwise appear human and entirely lack the fearsome or grotesque features of traditional oni. The context of oni in popular culture is similarly varied, with instances such as appearances in animated cartoons, video games and use as commercial mascots. 
The videogame series  ‘’Onimusha’’ is largely based on Japanese demon/oni/yokai folklore and themes. 
The game series Touhou Project has several characters based on oni such as Suika Ibuki, who is also animated singing the popular song "We Are Japanese Goblin", an example of modern popular culture depicting Oni as far less menacing than in the past.
 A character based on the oni appears in the Japanese Satire Anime "Tentai Senshi Sunred/Astro Fighter Sunred", who works as an oni for hire to dispel bad luck and also part of the "evil" organization Florsheim.
All kinds of oni appear in Inuyasha.
 Hyakujuu Sentai Gaoranger (and its American counterpart, Power Rangers Wild Force), Ogre Tribe Org is the main antagonist to fight the Gaorangers and Power Animals.
The Unicode Emoji character U+1F479 (👹) represents an oni, under the name "Japanese Ogre".
In the TV show LEGO Ninjago: Masters of Spinjitzu, Oni appear as a primordial force of destruction and serve as the main antagonists of the show's tenth season, March of the Oni. Lord Garmadon and his son: Lloyd Garmadon are offspring of an oni and a dragon.
The popular manga and anime Demon Slayer: Kimetsu no Yaiba or Demon Slayer features oni as the antagonists. The oni in this anime are depicted similarly to Vampires, 
 They are both immortals humanoid beings with inhuman traits, supernatural abilities, who consume humans, and they both are weak to the same three weaknesses: sunlight, a special fragrance (garlic for vampires, wisteria for demons) and a certain metal (Silver for vampires, Nichirin Swords for demons).  In the English release, they are referred to as demons instead of oni.
The MOBA Heroes of the Storm has oni-themed skins for its characters Genji and The Butcher.
The asymmetrical 4 vs 1 multiplayer game Dead by Daylight features an oni, Kazan Yamaoka, as one of its killers. The oni is represented as a blood-thirsty demon that gets stronger the more blood it consumes.
 The world of MooShu in Wizard101 contains several oni that the player must face. These include the Plague, War, Death, and Jade Oni. These oni are depicted as being elephantine in appearance.
 In The Venture Bros. episode I Know Why The Caged Bird Kills, Dr. Orpheus attempts to free Dr. Venture of an oni who is haunting him after returning from a business trip to Japan.
 In Urusei Yatsura the main heroine Lum is an oni from space who wears a tiger bikini.
In the Japanese role-playing horror game Ao Oni, the titular oni is depicted as a blue/purplish creature with a large head and human-like features. In the subsequent 2014 movie adaptation, the oni is given a radical makeover to appear more monstrous and scary, while in its 2016 anime adaptation, the oni remains faithful to its original appearance.
In the action role-playing game Nioh and its sequel, Nioh 2, the protagonists fight against a variety of Yōkai, including various types of Oni. 
In the fantasy role-playing game Genshin Impact, the character Arataki Itto is of crimson oni heritage; signified by his red horns and markings on his body. The plot of "Rise Up, Golden Soul", the first act of his Story Quest, is centered around the conflict between the crimson and blue oni tribes. The allegorical Inazuman fairytale of Aka and Ao that illustrates the divergence of the two tribes directly references the red and blue oni tale.
In the Japanese action-adventure game Ghost of Tsushima, a multiplayer Legends Mode was added in which the player fights hordes of oni in survival and story missions. It features several different types of oni including large brutes, tengu crow demons, and ultra-powerful elder oni.
In the RPG series Yo-kai Watch there are various yo-kai that are oni. From the fourth game onward they become a full on yo-kai sub-species.
In the tabletop game Shadowrun, oni are a metavariant of orks with horns, more attractive features, and bright red or blue skin. They live primarily in Japan.

See also

 Shuten-dōji
 Dokkaebi
 Daeva
 Ifrit
 Devil 
 Namahage
 Onibaba 
 Ogre
 Oni Gozen
 Orc
 Sazae-oni
 Urusei Yatsura Demon Slayer: Kimetsu no Yaiba''
 Ushi-oni 
 Wendigo
 Yōkai
 Yūrei
 Ravana
 Kappa

References

Citations

Bibliography

External links

 
Ogres
Monsters
Yōkai
Asian demons
Japanese words and phrases
Devils
Trolls